Klebang (Jawi: قليبڠ) is a suburb of Ipoh, Perak, Malaysia.

References

External links 

Ipoh
Populated places in Perak